Bianca van Rangelrooy (born April 1959) is a New Zealand artist.

Life
Van Rangelrooy was born in Wellington, New Zealand and received her BFA from the University of Canterbury.  She is known for her public art in government buildings in New Zealand. Van Rangelrooy also works in environmental art, drawing, painting, sculpture and digital photography. She currently lectures(2011) in landscape architecture at Lincoln University in Christchurch.

Notable works include   Merger] , which is located in the Courts Building in Christchurch.

References

1959 births
Academic staff of the Lincoln University (New Zealand)
Living people
New Zealand artists
University of Canterbury alumni